Witchampton is a village and civil parish in East Dorset, England, situated on the River Allen  north of Wimborne Minster. The 2011 census recorded a population of 398.

Witchampton lies close to where the dip slope of the chalk hills of Cranborne Chase is overlain by newer deposits of London Clay. Although Witchampton is sited within the area of the chalk, where cob and thatch are the traditional building materials, the nearness of the clay has resulted in many of the older houses in the village being built from brick. The early 16th-century Abbey House contains some of the earliest brickwork in the county.

To the northeast of the village there used to be a paper mill by the river. In 1980 it was described by writer Roland Gant as a "discreet industrial oasis in an agricultural plain". It had been in operation since the early 18th century, but has now been converted to residential accommodation.

11th-century whalebone chess pieces have been found within the parish, and are some of the best surviving early English chess pieces.

References

External links

Villages in Dorset
Civil parishes in Dorset